Basil McKenzie (7 October 1926 – 6 June 2016) was a Jamaican sprinter. He competed in the men's 100 metres at the 1948 Summer Olympics.

Competition record

References

1926 births
2016 deaths
Athletes (track and field) at the 1948 Summer Olympics
Jamaican male sprinters
Olympic athletes of Jamaica
Place of birth missing